INS Shakti (A57) (Strenght) is a  in service with the Indian Navy. She was built by Fincantieri, an Italian shipbuilding company based in Trieste. She is the second and final ship of her class. Shakti, along with her predecessor , is one of the largest ships of the Indian Navy.

Construction of the vessel began in November 2009 and it was launched in October 2010. She was handed over to India by September 2011 and was commissioned on 1 October 2011. The construction of the vessel was completed in a record time of 27 months, after the contract worth  was signed in April 2008.

INS Shakti can refuel four ships at a time, with a fuelling speed of 1,500 tonnes per hour while her predecessors had a speed of 300 per hour. She is also equipped with state-of-the art electronics, medical facilities and storage spaces. According to Admiral Nirmal Verma, Shakti would significantly add to the Indian Navy's ability to conduct and sustain operations distant from the coast.

Design and description

General characteristics and propulsion 
The complement is about 200, including 20 officers.

To help prevent accidental oil spills the ship features a double hull configuration, in compliance with MARPOL 73/78.

Capacity 
The Deepak-class tanker can carry 17,900 tonnes of cargo, including 15,500 tonnes of liquid cargo (water, ship and aircraft fuel) and 500 tonnes of solid cargo (victuals and ammunition). The modern cargo handling facility on board the ship enables transfer of heavy solid cargo via a 30 tonne capacity deck crane, and simultaneous fuelling of multiple ships at sea, and can refuel at the rate of 1,500 tonnes per hour. Workshop facilities on the ship can support other ships of the fleet and it is capable of supporting heavy helicopters.

Self-defence systems 
The ship has self-defence capability and is equipped with an indigenous anti-missile defence chaff system. On-board systems include fully automatic engine controls, power management and battle damage control systems. According to the navy, the ship was designed to operate as a command platform. The ship is fitted with four AK-630 Close-in weapon systems, which can fire at a rate of 4,000 to 10,000 rounds a minute.

Construction and service 
Fincantieri was awarded the contract to construct Shakti in April 2008, at a cost of US$300 million. The Deepak-class tankers were the first warships constructed for India by Fincantieri. The construction of the ship began in November 2009 at Fincantieri's Sestri Ponente shipyard in Italy. The sea trials started in December 2010. The ship was formally handed over to the Indian Navy on 23 September 2011, in under two years. Admiral Nirmal Verma, the chief of the Naval Staff, commissioned the tanker at Visakhapatnam, the home of the Eastern Naval Command, saying that the ship enhanced the reach of the navy well beyond the limits of the Indian Ocean.

INS Shakti is the third tanker of the same name of the navy. The first Shakti had a displacement of 3,000 tonnes and was commissioned during World War II. She was in service with the Indian Navy from 29 January 1954 and decommissioned on 31 December 1967; whilst the second Shakti, a large ship built by a German yard, was commissioned on 21 February 1976 and decommissioned on 21 July 2007, after more than 31 years of naval service.

2012 

Malabar 2012
In April 2012, Shakti took part in the Indian navy's annual maritime exercise with the US Navy, Malabar 2012, in the Bay of Bengal. During these exercises, the ship replenished , flagship of the US Navy's Carrier Strike Group 1.

South China Sea and the North-West Pacific
In May 2012, Shakti, as part of a battle group of four ships, began a sustained operational deployment to the South China Sea and the North West Pacific Ocean. This battle group was under the command of Rear Admiral P Ajit Kumar, Flag Officer Commanding, Eastern Naval Command. According to the Ministry of Defence, the two-month deployment, far from India's usual area of operations, along with naval exercises with a number of countries, aimed to demonstrate the Indian navy's operational reach.

During the deployment, the battle group participated in passage exercises with the navies of the countries visited. The 'Passage Exercises' focussed on maritime security cooperation, which included humanitarian aid and disaster relief (HADR) operations and 'Visit, Board, Search and Seizure' (VBSS) drills for anti-piracy operations. These exercises aimed to increase naval inter-operability, enabling the two navies to function with enhanced coordination during possible HADR operations. In addition, during the port visits, the Fleet Commander along with the Commanding Officers of the ships met high-ranking officials of the navy, state administration, port management, coastal security organisation, police, and other stakeholders of maritime security in the countries visited, to share professional experiences and exchange best practices in areas of mutual interest.

JIMEX 2012
The ship was deployed in the North West Pacific for JIMEX 2012 (Japan-India Maritime Exercise) with the four ship group, and took part in India's first bi-lateral maritime exercise with Japan. The Japanese Maritime Self-Defence Force (JMSDF) was represented by two destroyers, one maritime patrol aircraft and a helicopter.

The four ships entered Tokyo on 5 June 2012 after visiting Singapore, Vietnam, Philippines and South Korea. They stayed in Tokyo for three days. This visit coincided with the commemoration of 60 years of diplomatic relations between India and Japan. Vice Admiral Anil Chopra, Flag Officer Commanding-in-Chief Eastern Naval Command also visited Tokyo to witness the first JIMEX.

South-east Asia
After the deployment in the North pacific, the battle group was deployed in the South China Sea. As part of India's Look East policy, the ships visited the Shanghai port on 13 June 2012, for a five-day goodwill tour. INS Shakti served as the fuel and logistics tanker to the three destroyers. The ships left the port on 17 June 2012. Before leaving the port, the ships conducted routine passage exercise with the People's Liberation Army Navy.

After the visits to Singapore, Vietnam, Philippines, Japan, South Korea and China, the ships visited Port Klang, Malaysia. This was the last port call of the battle group, after which it returned to the Eastern fleet of the Indian Navy, after being on a two-month-long deployment which started in May 2012.

2013 

TROPEX 2013
Shakti was part of a seven-ship fleet which represented the Eastern Naval Command at Indian Navy's annual TROPEX exercise, which concluded on 1 March 2013. TROPEX 2013 was a month-long theatre level exercise which was conducted off India's west coast. The navy conducted manoeuvres, weapon firings and tactical evaluation.

This flotilla made a port call at Kochi on 4 March 2013, en route to its forward deployment.

South China Sea and Western Pacific
The ship was part of a four-vessel fleet on a regular operational deployment to the South China Sea and the Western Pacific during May–June 2013, which departed from India on 20 May 2013. The fleet led by Rear Admiral Ajit Kumar consisted of stealth frigate , Rajput-class destroyer INS Ranvijay, corvette  and Shakti, and carried more than 800 crew members. Shakti, along with Ranvijay sailed from Port Blair, Andaman and Nicobar on 21 May and were joined by Satpura and Kirch, which arrived from Singapore after participating in a maritime exhibition and a bilateral naval exercise. The ships made a five-day port call at Malaysia's Port Klang on 25 May 2013.

The ships will conduct passage exercises and practice both conventional wartime drills and cooperative military action against unconventional sea threats with the Malaysian Navy. They will make further port calls at Da Nang in Vietnam and Manila in the Philippines. They are expected to return to India by June 2013. The fleet would be deployed in the South China Sea and the Western Pacific from mid-May to end June to reinforce military ties with ASEAN, in addition to showcasing India's naval capabilities.

2014 
Western Pacific:
In July 2014, an Indian Navy task force comprising INS Ranvijay, INS Shivalik, and Shakti visited the Russian Pacific Fleet at Vladivostok for Indra-2014 exercises. The Russian fleet consisted of guided-missile cruiser , the flagship of the Pacific Fleet; the destroyer , the Peresvet and several auxiliary ships, naval aircraft and helicopters. The exercise took place from 17 to 19 July in the Peter the Great Gulf in the Sea of Japan. The ships conducted tactical maneuvering drills, artillery and missile firing drills, as well as helicopter deck-landing drills. After exercising with the Russian Navy, the task force moved to the Pacific Ocean to exercise with the Japanese and the US Navy during Malabar 2014. The harbour phase of the drills was conducted in Sasebo, Japan.

2015 

Shakti deployed with other ships of the Eastern fleet to the Andaman & Nicobar Command, to exercise in the Andaman Sea and then deployed overseas to exercise with other navies of the region from Indonesia, Malaysia, Singapore, Cambodia, Thailand and Australia, as part of India's Act East policy. This task force sailed under the command of Flag Officer Eastern Fleet Rear Admiral Ajendra Bahadur Singh, VSM, who commanded from INS Satpura. The ships make port calls at Jakarta (Indonesia), Fremantle (Australia), Kuantan (Malaysia), Sattahip (Thailand) and Sihanoukville (Cambodia). They exercised for four days with RSS Supreme and submarine RSS Archer along with fighters, patrol aircraft and helicopters of the Singaporean Navy from 24–27 May in SIMBEX 2015.

See also

References

External links 

 Image – INS Shakti

Deepak-class fleet tankers
2010 ships
Ships built by Fincantieri
Tankers of the Indian Navy